Franz Ignaz Pollinger was a mid-19th century Austrian painter.  His work "Der erste Christbaum in Ried" (The first Christian tree in Ried) was completed in 1848.  It depicts a Christmas celebration including mayor Josef Anton.

References

19th-century Austrian painters
19th-century Austrian male artists
Austrian male painters